Colin Fleming and Jamie Murray were the defending champions but decided not to participate.
Jan Hájek and Lukáš Lacko won the title after defeating Lukáš Rosol and David Škoch 7–5, 7–5 in the final.

Seeds

Draw

Draw

References
 Main Draw

Slovak Open - Doubles
2011 Men's Doubles